Underwear is the clothes worn next to the skin, usually under other clothes.

Underwear may also refer to:
"Underwear", a song by The Magnetic Fields from their 1999 album 69 Love Songs
"Underwear", a song by Pulp from their 1995 album Different Class

 Underwear (album)